The  is located in the city of Nagoya in central Japan.

The museum building itself was constructed by Kisho Kurokawa, one of the leading Japanese architects, from 1983 to 1987.

Works by the surrealist Kansuke Yamamoto, Sean Scully, and Alexander Calder belong to its permanent collection. Artists such as Hakuyō Fuchikami, Nakaji Yasui and Jean-Michel Othoniel have exhibited their works there.

External links 

 Homepage of the Nagoya City Art Museum

Art museums and galleries in Nagoya
Kisho Kurokawa buildings